Prata may refer to:

Places
Brazil
Prata (Minas Gerais), a municipality in the state of Minas Gerais

Burkina Faso
Prata, Burkina Faso, a village in Sissili Province

Italy
Prata, Massa Marittima, in the Province of Grosseto
Prata, Suvereto, in the Province of Livorno
Prata Camportaccio, a municipality in the Province of Sondrio 
Prata d'Ansidonia, a municipality in the Province of L'Aquila
Prata di Pordenone, a municipality in the Province of Pordenone
Prata di Principato Ultra, a municipality in the Province of Avellino 
Prata Sannita, a municipality in the Province of Caserta

Cuisine
Prata (food), a traditional meat dish of Slovenian cuisine
Roti prata, a pancake bread of Malaysian Indian cuisine

Personalities
Pietro Pileo di Prata, an Italian bishop

See also
Prato (disambiguation)